The Belfast and County Down Railway (BCDR) Class 2 locomotive was built by Harland and Wolff (H&W) in 1933. The first diesel locomotive build by H&W it was initially designated D1.  It often worked the branch to Ballynahinch.  The UTA designated the locomotive 202 but returned it to H&W in 1951 to work the shipyards.

References 

Railway locomotives introduced in 1933
5 ft 3 in gauge locomotives
Diesel-electric locomotives of Northern Ireland
Scrapped locomotives